Sosoli Talawadua (born 30 June 1989) is a New Zealand rugby union player. She was part of the Black Ferns champion 2017 Rugby World Cup squad in Ireland. She also plays for Hurricanes Poua in the Super Rugby Aupiki competition.

Rugby career 
Talawadua debuted for the Black Ferns on 27 November 2016 against Ireland at Dublin. She was part of the Black Ferns champion 2017 Rugby World Cup side.

Talawadua returned to Whanganui after representing Waikato for six seasons in the Farah Palmer Cup.

In 2019, She was named player of the year for the Manawatū Cyclones. In 2020, She worked part-time as the women’s and secondary schools’ rugby development officer for the Whanganui Rugby Union.

In December 2022, Talawadua was confirmed as one of three final signings for Hurricanes Poua for the 2023 Super Rugby Aupiki season.

References

External links 
 Sosoli Talawadua at Black Ferns

1989 births
Living people
New Zealand women's international rugby union players
New Zealand female rugby union players